Charles Arthur Hayes (February 17, 1918 – April 8, 1997) was an American politician who served as a member of the United States House of Representatives, representing Illinois's 1st congressional district, from 1983 to 1993.

Early life 
Hayes was born in Cairo, Illinois, and graduated from Cairo's Sumner High School in 1935. He was a trade unionist from 1938 to 1983 and served as vice president of the United Food and Commercial Workers Union.

Career 
Hayes was a resident of Chicago for most of his adult life. Hayes was also prolific union man for 45 years. In the 1950s, he raised funds for Martin Luther King Jr.'s voter registration drive in the South. He was a civil rights leader who worked closely with King in the Southern Christian Leadership Conference during the 1960s. Later, he was one of major labor leaders arrested during the 1980s anti-apartheid protests that eventually won the freedom of Nelson Mandela. Congressman Hayes was the CBTU's first executive vice president, serving until 1986.

Hayes was elected as a Democrat to the 98th United States Congress by a special election held on August 23, 1983, to fill the vacancy caused by the resignation of Harold Washington, who had been elected mayor of Chicago. While a representative, Hayes was on the Committee on Education and Labor and Small Business Committee. He was most noted for pieces of legislation to encourage school dropouts to re-enter and complete their education.

His candidacy for renomination in 1992 to the 103rd United States Congress was unsuccessful, as he was defeated in the Democratic primary by Bobby Rush, partly due to the House banking scandal.

Hayes was also one of the founding members of Rainbow/PUSH, along with Jesse Jackson.

Death 
Hayes died from complications of lung cancer at the age of 79. Then-Congressman Jesse Jackson Jr. spoke at Hayes' funeral.

Electoral history

See also
List of African-American United States representatives

References

External links

The Political Graveyard - Entry
Biography from the Coalition of Black Trade Unionists
Charles Hayes Biography from The HistoryMakers
 

1918 births
1997 deaths
African-American people in Illinois politics
American trade union leaders
Politicians from Chicago
African-American members of the United States House of Representatives
Deaths from lung cancer
People from Cairo, Illinois
Deaths from cancer in Illinois
United Food and Commercial Workers people
Democratic Party members of the United States House of Representatives from Illinois
20th-century American politicians
Trade unionists from Illinois
African-American trade unionists
20th-century African-American politicians
African-American men in politics